Sanya (also spelled Samah) is the southernmost city on Hainan Island, and one of the four prefecture-level cities of Hainan Province in South China.

Nevertheless, its built-up (or metro) area encompassing Haitang and Jiyang Districts was home to 801,020 inhabitants as of 2020.

The city is renowned for its tropical climate and has emerged as a popular tourist destination, also serving as the training site of the Chinese national beach volleyball team. Sanya is home to small concentrations of Utsul people. Sanya is also the location of Yulin Naval Base, a major military facility on the South China Sea which is home to the People's Liberation Army Navy ballistic nuclear missile fleet.

History
Known in ancient times as Yazhou, postal romanization: Aichow, literally "cliff state or prefecture", Sanya's history dates to the Qin Dynasty (221–206 BCE). Due to its remoteness from the political centers during the Qin Dynasty, Sanya was sometimes called Tianya Haijiao, meaning "the end of the sky and ocean" or "the end of the earth". As a result, the city served as a place of exile for officials who found themselves out of favor with the country's rulers.

During the Tang dynasty, a Buddhist monk accidentally landed here, using the site as a staging post on his missionary journey to Japan.

20th century

In 1912, Yazhou became Yaxian (Yai-hsien) (postal: Aihsien).

In 1958, administration of Yaxian relocated from Yacheng to Sanya and Yaxian merged with Baoting, Lingshui, Niulou, and Xinglong, Wanning, to become a large county. In 1959 and 1961 these areas were separated to establish Baoting and Lingshui while Yaxian County remained in its current prefecture. Approved by the State Council of China, Yaxian was upgraded to Sanya City on September26, 1987 and on December30, Sanya City was officially established.

In 2007 the Beijing Olympic Organizing Committee announced that the city of Sanya would become the first leg of the Beijing 2008 Summer Olympics torch relay in China.

Geography

Sanya lies at the southern tip of Hainan Island on Sanya Bay. Located at 18° 15' N latitude, Sanya is–after Sansha (also administered by Hainan Province)–the second-southernmost prefecture-level city nationally. Though the administrative area (Sanya City) has a rough topography, the city itself is generally flat, lying on a parcel of land between low-level mountains to the north and the South China Sea.

Climate
The area has a tropical wet and dry climate (Köppen Aw), featuring very warm weather all year around. Monsoonal influences are strong, with a relatively lengthy wet season and a pronounced dry season. Water temperatures remain above  year-round.

Subdivisions 
Before July 30, 2014, there were direct jurisdiction over four county-level districts and two township-level subdistricts, six towns and four state-run farms in Sanya City. Now there are four districts in Sanya.

Tourism
In recent years Sanya has become a popular tourist destination. Numerous international five star hotel chains are now established in the area. In 2009, the luxury Mandarin Oriental, Sanya hotel opened in the Dadong Hai area, the first Mandarin Oriental property in Hainan Island. There are now over 100 hotels, ranging from international brands to locally managed resorts.

Russian and English signs can be seen throughout the city. In response to claims of over-charging of tourists (whether foreign or Chinese) at restaurants in the city, Hainan government officials and Sanya city officials have vowed to crack down on the practice. The Sanya Industrial and Commercial Bureau has implemented a real-time information system of the city's seafood restaurants during the May Day holiday for public supervision in order to stop any future price gouging by restaurants.

Sanya also hosts the Guanyin of Nanshan, that is located within the Nanshan Temple (Sanya).

Nature reserves of Yalong Bay Tropical Paradise Forest Park and Sanya Coral Reef National Nature Reserve are located nearby Yalong Bay, and Yalong Bay National Tourism Holiday Resort was created. In recent years, as the waters of Sanya Bay and others below mentioned are becoming clearer and healthier, several species of dolphins, including endangered Chinese white dolphins, appear along the coasts from time to time. However, they have not been considered as targeted tourism attractions.

Transportation
The city is served by Sanya Phoenix International Airport. Taxis are available throughout the city.

Buses from other parts of Hainan serve Sanya's bus terminal. The No. 8 bus connects the airport to Dadonghai Beach. From there tourists can take the 24 or 25 bus to Yalong Bay or the 28 bus to Haitang Bay. There is also a free bus from Luhuitou Square to the Duty-Free Shopping Center at Haitang Bay, the largest such center in China.

Hainan East Ring Intercity Rail 
The Hainan East Ring Intercity Rail links Sanya and Haikou and runs along the east coast of Hainan Island. There are 15 stations in between, either in operation or still under construction. Travel time from Sanya to Haikou is approximately 1 hour and 22 minutes. The Hainan Western Ring High-Speed Railway, running along the west coast of the province also links Sanya to Haikou.

Tram

Sanya's tram service began trial operation on 7 January 2019. Trams are composed of five carriages with a maximum seating capacity of 362 people. In built up and urbanised areas, the maximum speed of the tram is 50 km/h. The current tram route begins at Sanya Railway Station and finishes at Jiankang Road Station. Full operation of the first line started on 10 October 2020.

Social services

Hospitals
There are a total of 54 hospitals in Sanya as of March 2019, both public hospitals funded by the state and private hospitals. And numerous clinics for doing annual health-checks, which are usually brands of national chains in China, such as Ciming Healthcheck.

Hainan 301 Hospital, a branch hospital of People's Liberation Army General Hospital, is located in the Haitang Bay area of Sanya. The hospital possesses a substantial number of state-of-the-art equipment for medical and research purposes which include a Da Vinci surgical system, different MIR system (including 1.5T MRI 3.0T MRI), Helical CT facilities (including 128-Slices CT), medical linear accelerator and electronic microscopes which are worth more than 450 million yuan. The hospital has 500 patient beds, and a total of 74 clinical, medical and nursing departments.

Sanya Traditional Chinese Medicine Hospital is located on Fenghuang Road. It is a grade-A tertiary hospital offering medical care, education, research, healthcare services and International Chinese Medicine exchange and cooperation.

Education

Colleges and universities

Sanya University Located at Xueyuan Rd., Yingbin Ave. Sanya Hainan 572022. Sanya University is an independent undergraduate university. The university has fourteen schools: Social Development, Law, Finance and Economics, Management, Tourism Management, Humanities and Communication, Arts, Foreign Languages, Engineering, Physical Education, General Education & Foundation Courses, International Tourism, International Education and Music, and other, and offers 56 undergraduate majors.

Qiongzhou University is located at 1 Yucai Road. The only public university located in Sanya, Qiongzhou is actively pursuing more foreign enrollments, hoping to attract Chinese tourism and language students to the city. Courses offered to international students are: elementary Chinese, intermediate Chinese, advanced Chinese (listening, speaking, reading and writing), English, Russian (listening, speaking, reading and writing), Chinese calligraphy and painting, Chinese martial arts, Chinese history, studies of Li and Miao Cultures, tourism and recreational management, and music performance.

Primary and secondary schools
The city government states on its website that "Being the second-largest city in Hainan, the education in Sanya is relatively better than the average level in Hainan Province" but that the kindergartens are not as good as those in major Chinese cities and that the primary and secondary schools are still below the Chinese national average.

According to the city government, Primary schools No.7 and No.9 Primary School are the best ones in the city and that Bayi Primary School "is also of good quality". The city government identifies the best lower secondary (junior high school) and upper secondary (senior high school) institutions as Sanya Shiyan Middle School and Sanya No.1 High School, respectively.

The International School of Sanya (formerly Canadian International School of Sanya) is the first school to offer two programs: Canadian and Mandarin, in Hainan. The school has announced its relocation to the BanShanBanDao -Serenity Coast residential area in August 2014, where the new campus will offer pre-K. day students and boarding facilities for students.

Events
The city has hosted:
Boao Forum for Asia Annual high level forums for world leaders focused on the Asian region and its stakeholders.
2014 WTTC Global Summit Keynote speakers: Kofi Annan, Jeffrey Katzenberg, Dame DeAnne Julius, Yao Ming
2011–12 Volvo Ocean Race Leg 4 Start to Auckland
2011 BRICS summit
Elite Model Look in 2008 and 2009
Miss World contest in 2003, 2004, 2005, 2007, 2010, 2015, 2017 and 2018
Mister World contest in 2007
World's Strongest Man contest in 2006 and 2013
2012 Sanya International Beach Musical Festival
2013 ITF Women's Circuit – Sanya
2014–15 Volvo Ocean Race In-port race and Leg 4 Start to Auckland
FIA Formula E Sanya ePrix from 2019
2020 Asian Beach Games

Sister cities

Gallery

References

External links

Guanyin of the South Sea of Sanya article — with pictures, author confuses "Buddha" and "Guanyin".
Whatsonsanya.com: News, travel, business and cultural guide to Sanya and Hainan Province

 
Cities in Hainan
Prefecture-level divisions of Hainan